Crataegus flava, common names summer haw and yellow-fruited thorn, is a species of hawthorn native to the southeastern United States from Virginia to Florida, west to Mississippi.  Unfortunately, due to an error by Sargent the name C. flava was, and often still is, used for a different species C. lacrimata, which belongs to a different series, the Lacrimatae series. Flavae is another group of species that were thought to be related to the misidentified C. flava, and although it is now apparent that they are not related, the name of the group remains. Because the true identity of this species has only recently been discovered, the name is rarely used correctly. Individuals with red fruit occur; these have sometimes been assigned to a separate species, Crataegus senta.

Like most hawthorns, plants similar to C. flava bear edible fruit that can be used to make jellies and jams, have a flavor that is mealy and a bit dry, and grow in large clusters. Some are shaped like pears. Also like most hawthorns, the wood of C. flava is hard and can be made into small tools.

See also 
 List of hawthorn species with yellow fruit

References

External links
USDA Plants Profile for Crataegus lacrimata
 Info from Plants for a Future for "Crataegus flava"

flava